Falcons are a genus of raptor (bird of prey). 

Falcons may also refer to:

School sports teams
 Adamson Soaring Falcons, a collegiate basketball (UAAP) team in the Philippines
 Air Force Falcons, the sports teams of the United States Air Force Academy
 Bentley Falcons, the sports teams of Bentley University in Waltham, Massachusetts
 Bowling Green Falcons, the sports teams of Bowling Green State University in Bowling Green, Ohio
 Falcon College, an independent, boarding school for boys aged 12–18 in Matebeleland South, Zimbabwe
 Friends Falcons, the sports teams of Friends University in Wichita, Kansas
 NIST International School Falcons, the sports teams of NIST International School in Bangkok, Thailand
 Seattle Pacific Falcons, the sports teams of Seattle Pacific University in Seattle, Washington
 St. Augustine's Falcons, the sports teams of St. Augustine's University in Raleigh, North Carolina
 Texas–Permian Basin Falcons, the sports teams of the University of Texas of the Permian Basin in Odessa, Texas

Other sports teams
 Atlanta Falcons, an NFL (American) football team
 Bata Falcons, an association football club based in Montserrat
 Detroit Falcons (disambiguation), several teams
 Falcons (rugby union), a South African rugby team who play in the Currie Cup
 Geelong Falcons, a youth Australian Rules Football club
 Gippsland Falcons SC, an Australian association football club active 1963–2001
 Kandy Falcons, a cricket team in the Lanka Premier League
 Kelowna Falcons, a baseball team in the West Coast League
 Mumbai Falcons, an Indian motorsports team
 Newcastle Falcons, a rugby team based in Newcastle, England
 Nürnberg Falcons BC, a basketball club based in Nuremberg, Germany
 RAF Falcons, a British military parachute display team
 Springfield Falcons, an American Hockey League team
 St. Catharines Falcons (1943–1947), a junior ice hockey team in St. Catharines, Ontario, active 1943–1947
 St. Catharines Falcons (1968–), a junior ice hockey team in St. Catharines, Ontario
 Ukrainian Falcons, the aerobatic demonstration team of the Ukrainian Air Force
 USA Falcons, a national rugby union team
 West Perth Football Club, an Australian rules football club
 Winnipeg Falcons, a Canadian ice hockey team

Entertainment
 The Falcons, an American rhythm and blues vocal group
 Falcons (film), a 2002 Icelandic film
 The Falcons (film), a 1970 Hungarian film

Other uses
 Socialist Youth of Germany – Falcons, a voluntary organisation
 Iraqi Falcons Intelligence Cell, an anti-terrorism unit

See also
 Falcon (disambiguation)